Potash is an unincorporated community in Randolph County, Alabama, United States.

History
Potash is likely named for the potassium salts found and mined in the surrounding area.

A post office operated under the name Potash from 1890 to 1897.

References

Unincorporated communities in Randolph County, Alabama
Unincorporated communities in Alabama